Harry Hibbs may refer to:

Harry Hibbs (footballer) (1906–1984), English football goalkeeper
Harry Hibbs (musician) (1942–1989), Newfoundland traditional musician

See also
Henry Hibbs (disambiguation)